The Nuora ( or "Нуорда" —now obsolete), also known as Strekalovka is a river in Yakutia (Sakha Republic), Russia.

The river flows across Zhigansky District and has its mouth by Zhigansk, the district capital.

Course  
The Nuora is a minor left tributary of the Lena. It has its sources in an area of lakes, the largest of which is Lake Taryn (Озеро Тарын), in the northern area of the Central Yakutian Lowland. It flows in a roughly northeastern direction forming meanders in the floodplain to the south of the Khoruongka. Finally it meets the left bank of the Lena at Zhigansk,  from its mouth.

The river is fed by rain and snow. It freezes in mid-October and stays under ice until late May or early June.

See also
List of rivers of Russia

References

External links 

Fishing & Tourism in Yakutia
Melnikov Permafrost Institute - Expeditions

Rivers of the Sakha Republic
Central Yakutian Lowland